Niphoparmena jeanneli is a species of beetle in the family Cerambycidae. It was described by Villiers in 1940.

References

jeanneli
Beetles described in 1940